Malik Abbas Rehman is a Pakistani politician who was a member of the Provincial Assembly of Khyber Pakhtunkhwa from August 2019 to January 2023.

Political career
Rehman contested 2019 Khyber Pakhtunkhwa provincial election on 20 July 2019 from constituency PK-104 (Mohmand-II) as an independent. He won the election by the majority of 1,950 votes over the runner up Muhammad Arif of Jamiat Ulema-e-Islam (F). He garnered 11,751 votes while Arif received 9,801 votes.

References

Living people
Independent MPAs (Khyber Pakhtunkhwa)
Politicians from Khyber Pakhtunkhwa
Year of birth missing (living people)